Sutherland Sharks Football Club is an Australian Association football club based in the suburb of Sutherland in Sydney New South Wales. The club currently competes in the National Premier Leagues NSW. The club's home games are played at Seymour Shaw Park, located in the southern Sydney suburb of Miranda. It recently opened a new academy. It is incorporated as a non-profit club.

History
The origins of Sutherland Sharks are traced back to the founding of Sutherland United SFC in 1930. By 1936, the club had grown markedly leading to a split and formation of the current-day club, albeit under a different name – Casuals Soccer Football Club. In the post-WWII era, the club grew and found success in the St George Football Association but in 1947 they stepped up to the Metropolitan Soccer League (effectively the Sydney 2nd Division, behind only the old NSW Soccer Association 1st Division). The club soon earned its stripes in this highly competitive league winning the title in just their second year and gaining promotion to the heady heights of the 1st Division but disappointingly, financial constraints forced them to let the opportunity pass. It was another 24 years before the club moved into the top flight state league.

In 1949 the club changed its name to the more representative Sutherland Shire Casuals SFC, and in 1950 the club acquired a long-term lease on the Seymour Shaw field. However the club did not move permanently to the Miranda ground until 1959, continuing to use Sutherland Oval. In 1955, the club again changed its name to Sutherland Shire Soccer Football Club. In 1961 it amalgamated with the ailing St George district club (a separate entity to the later St George Budapest) and for a brief period became 'Sutherland–St George SFC' before reverting to its previous name in 1963.

The club made the 1967 Sydney Federation Division Two Final series after finishing the season in fourth. The club then finished second in the Final series and qualified for the Grand Final against Bankstown who finished first. Sutherland Shire lost the game 1–0.

In 1971 Sutherland won the Sydney Federation Division Two, securing promotion to the NSW top league. In 1978 the club won a major trophy for the first time when they claimed the prestigious Ampol Cup. Later that year Sutherland defeated Sydney Croatia 2–1 in a replayed Grand Final at Wentworth Park. The club again won the Ampol Cup in 1981 and also achieved a 3–1 Grand Final win against Melita Eagles at St George Stadium in 1986.

In 1984, when the National Soccer League expanded by the addition of four Sydney clubs, Sutherland, who was initially tipped to join the league, was edged out by the newly formed Penrith City. During the 1990s the club recorded its first ever premiership in 1991, and followed this up with a repeat victory in 1996. The club remained in the 1st Division until the 2001/02 season, relegating for two seasons and then returning to the top flight.

Current squad
As of 5 February 2023

Honours
National Premier Leagues NSW:
Champions (3): 1978, 1986, 2009
Premiers (2): 1991, 2008

National Premier Leagues NSW 2:
Champions (1): 1971
Runners-Up (1): 1967
Premiers (1): 1971
Runners-Up (1): 1970

Waratah Cup:
Champions (4): 1978, 1981, 2009, 2012

References

External links
 Official website
 Sutherland Sharks @ Facebook

 
Association football clubs established in 1930
New South Wales Premier League teams
National Premier Leagues clubs
Soccer clubs in Sydney
1930 establishments in Australia
Sutherland Shire